Ludo is a given name, common as a Flemish name.  It can be a short form of Ludovic, Ludovicus, Luděk, Ľudovít, Ludwig, and related names.

People with the name
Ludo Campbell-Reid, New Zealand urban planner
Ludo Coeck (1955–1988), Belgian footballer
Ludo De Keulenaer (born 1960), Belgian racing cyclist
Ludo De Witte (born 1956), Belgian writer
Ludo Delcroix (born 1950), Belgian racing cyclist
Ludo Dielis (born 1945), Belgian carom billiards player
Ludo Dierckxsens (born 1964), Belgian racing cyclist
Ludo Frijns (born 1957), Belgian racing cyclist
Ludo Graham (born 1961), British television producer and director
Ludo Lacroix (born 1965), French motor racing engineer 
Ludo Lefebvre (born 1971), French chef, restaurateur and television personality
Ľudo Lehen (1925–2014), Slovak painter and chess problem composer 
Ludo Loos (born 1955), Belgian racing cyclist
Ludo Martens (1946–2011), Belgian Communist political activist 
 Ludo Mikloško (born 1961), Czech football goalkeeper.
Ludo Moritz Hartmann  (1865-1924), Austrian historian, diplomat and politician
Ľudo Ondrejov (1901–1962), Slovak poet and prose writer
Ludo Peeters (born 1953), Belgian racing cyclist
Ludo Philippaerts (born 1963), Belgian show jumping rider
Ludo Poppe, Belgian television producer
Ludo Rocher (1926-2016), Belgian-born American Sanskrit scholar
Ludo Stuart (fl.1923–30), Scottish rugby player
Ludo Troch, Belgian film editor
Ludo Van der Heyden (born 1950s), Belgian management scholar

Fictional characters with the name
 Ludo Bagman, a character from Harry Potter and the Goblet of Fire by J. K. Rowling
 Ludo, a character from the 1986 film Labyrinth
 Ludo, the primary antagonist of the Disney animated television series Star vs. the Forces of Evil

Dutch masculine given names
French masculine given names